The 2006 European Junior and U23 Canoe Slalom Championships took place in Nottingham, United Kingdom from 24 to 27 August 2006 under the auspices of the European Canoe Association (ECA) at the Holme Pierrepont National Watersports Centre. It was the 8th edition of the competition for Juniors (U18) and the 4th edition for the Under 23 category. A total of 15 medal events took place. No medals were awarded for the U23 men's C2 team event due to low number of participating countries.

Medal summary

Men

Canoe

Junior

U23

Kayak

Junior

U23

Women

Kayak

Junior

U23

Medal table

References

External links
European Canoe Association

European Junior and U23 Canoe Slalom Championships
European Junior and U23 Canoe Slalom Championships